Arthur Leo Kennedy (born January 9, 1942) is an American prelate of the Roman Catholic Church who served as an auxiliary bishop of the Archdiocese of Boston in Massachusetts from 2010 to 2017.After retirement, Kennedy took up residence at St. Mary's Parish in Dedham, Massachusetts.

Biography

Early life and education
Arthur Leo Kennedy was born on January 9, 1942, in Boston to Arthur and Helen (O’Rourke) Kennedy. He has four brothers (Kevin, Terrence, Christopher, and Brian) and one sister (Maurabeth). Kennedy has four nieces and four nephews. Kennedy attended Longfellow Elementary School in the Roslindale section of Boston and St. Aidan Grammar School in Brookline, Massachusetts.  He then entered Boston Latin School for his secondary education, graduating in 1959.

Kennedy received his Bachelor of Philosophy degree from Saint John's Seminary College in Boston in 1963.

Ordination, education and ministry
On December 17, 1966, Kennedy was ordained a priest of the Archdiocese of Boston in St. Peter’s Basilica in Rome by Bishop Francis Reh.   

After his ordination, Kennedy was assigned to St. Monica Parish in Methuen, Massachusetts. He obtained a Licentiate of Sacred Theology from the Pontifical Gregorian University in 1967.  In 1969, Kennedy was posted to St. Joseph Parish in East Boston, serving there until 1974.

In 1974, Kennedy joined the faculty of the Theology and Catholic Studies departments at the University of St. Thomas (UST) in St. Paul, Minnesota. He earned his doctorate in systematic theology/philosophy of religion in 1978 from Boston College.  In 1983, Kennedy was named as associate professor at UST and in 2001 a full professor. While at UST, Kennedy performed pastoral duties at Holy Trinity Parish in South Saint Paul, Minnesota, from 1974 to 1982 and at the Church of the Assumption in St. Paul from 1982 to 2000. 

In addition to teaching at UST and his pastoral duties, Kennedy also served on the faculty of the Saint Paul Seminary School of Divinity  in St. Paul (1990, 1995–2000, 2006) and was director of the masters in theology program.

In 2002, Kennedy was appointed as executive director of the Secretariat for Ecumenical and Interreligious Affairs for the United States Conference of Catholic Bishops in Washington, D.C. In 2007, Kennedy was named as rector of Saint John's Seminary, holding that position until July 2012.

Auxiliary Bishop of Boston
On June 30, 2010, Pope Benedict XVI appointed Kennedy as auxiliary bishop of the Archdiocese of Boston and titular bishop of Timidana. He was consecrated by Cardinal Seán O'Malley on September 14, 2010, at the Cathedral of the Holy Cross in Boston.  Kennedy's episcopal motto was:  Ut cognoscant te, meaning, "so that they may know you" from Saint John's Gospel (John 17:3). 

On Jan. 18, 2012, Cardinal O'Malley named Kennedy as episcopal vicar for the New Evangelization of the archdiocese.

Retirement 
Pope Francis accepted Kennedy's letter of resignation as auxiliary bishop of the Archdiocese of Boston on June 30, 2017.

See also
 

 Catholic Church hierarchy
 Catholic Church in the United States
 Historical list of the Catholic bishops of the United States
 List of Catholic bishops of the United States
 Lists of patriarchs, archbishops, and bishops

References

External links
 Biography from The Pilot
 Curriculum Vitae
 Remarks for News Conference
Roman Catholic Archdiocese of Boston

Living people
21st-century American Roman Catholic titular bishops
American Roman Catholic clergy of Irish descent
1942 births
Boston University School of Theology alumni
University of St. Thomas (Minnesota) alumni
Pontifical Gregorian University alumni
Pontifical North American College alumni
Roman Catholic Archdiocese of Boston
Religious leaders from Massachusetts